"Love Rain" is a 1999 song by Jill Scott co-written with Vidal Davis. The song appears twice on Scott's debut album Who Is Jill Scott? Words and Sounds Vol. 1 with Mos Def. A further two remixes, again with Mos Def, appeared on Collaborations; "Love Rain" (Head Nod Remix featuring Mos Def) – 5:02 and
"Love Rain" (Coffee Shop Mix featuring Mos Def) – 4:16. Although the song was Scott's first single, it appeared without a video.

See also
List of songs recorded by Mos Def

References

1999 songs
Jill Scott (singer) songs
Mos Def songs
Songs written by Vidal Davis
Songs written by Jill Scott (singer)
2000 singles